Sir Graham Moore Islands may refer to:

Sir Graham Moore Islands (Nunavut), in the Canadian Arctic 
Sir Graham Moore Islands (Western Australia), off the Kimberley coast  
Sir Graham Moore Island (Western Australia), off the Kimberley coast

See also
 Graham Moore (disambiguation)